Aonghas MacNeacail (7 June 1942 – 19 December 2022), nickname Aonghas dubh or Black Angus, was a contemporary writer in the Scottish Gaelic language.

Early life
MacNeacail was born in Uig on the Isle of Skye on 7 June 1942. He was raised in Idrigil, speaking Gaelic as a child. He was registered at birth as Angus Nicolson, but later changed his official name to "Aonghas MacNeacail," the Scottish Gaelic version of his name. He attended Uig Primary School and Portree High School, and from 1968 the University of Glasgow where he was one of a group of young writers who gathered around Philip Hobsbaum which also included James Kelman, Tom Leonard, Alasdair Gray, Liz Lochhead and Jeff Torrington.

Career
Besides drawing on Gaelic traditions, MacNeacail was influenced by the Black Mountain School of the United States. He held writing fellowships in Scotland, including residences at the Gaelic college of Sabhal Mòr Ostaig, and read his work at festivals around the world. He collaborated with musicians and visual artists, and written drama. His poetry has been widely published throughout the English speaking world in journals such as Ploughshares, Poetry Australia, World Poetry Almanac, and JuxtaProse Literary Magazine. He also received wide recognition and critical acclaim for his screenwriting and songwriting.

MacNeacail won the Stakis Prize for Scottish Writer of the Year with his third collection, Oideachadh Ceart ("A Proper Schooling and other poems"), in 1997. His collection Laoidh an Donais òig ("Hymn to a Young Demon") was published by Polygon in 2007. He was the partner of the actor and writer Gerda Stevenson.

Death
MacNeacail died in December 2022, at the age of 80.

References

External links
 
 Textualities entry
 
 

1942 births
2022 deaths
21st-century Scottish Gaelic poets
20th-century Scottish Gaelic poets
20th-century Scottish poets
21st-century Scottish poets
Alumni of the University of Glasgow
Sabhal Mòr Ostaig
Scottish opera librettists
Scottish Gaelic dramatists and playwrights
20th-century Scottish dramatists and playwrights
21st-century Scottish dramatists and playwrights
20th-century Scottish male writers
21st-century Scottish male writers
People from the Isle of Skye
People educated at Portree High School